Zukriegel Island is an island  long, lying between Rabot Island and Hennessy Islands, in the Biscoe Islands. First accurately shown on an Argentine government chart of 1957. Named by the United Kingdom Antarctic Place-Names Committee (UK-APC) in 1959 for Josef Zukriegel, Czechoslovakian geographer who specialized in sea ice studies.

See also 
 List of Antarctic and sub-Antarctic islands

Islands of the Biscoe Islands